The Rising Tide of Color: The Threat Against White World-Supremacy (1920), by Lothrop Stoddard, is a book about racialism and geopolitics, which describes the collapse of white supremacy and colonialism because of the population growth among "people of color", rising nationalism in colonized nations, and industrialization in China and Japan. To counter the perceived geopolitical threat, Stoddard advocated restricting non-white immigration into white-majority countries, restricting immigration of non-members of the “Nordic race” to countries primarily containing members of the “Nordic race”, restricting Asian migration to Africa, and slowly giving independence to European colonies in Asia (including the Middle East). A noted eugenicist, Stoddard supported a separation of the "primary races" of the world and warned against miscegenation, the mixing of the races.

Publication and reception 
In 1920, The Rising Tide of Color Against White World-Supremacy was positively reviewed and recommended by The New York Times: “Lothrop Stoddard evokes a new peril, that of an eventual submersion beneath vast waves of yellow men, brown men, black men and red men, whom the Nordics have hitherto dominated . . . with Bolshevism menacing us on the one hand and race extinction through warfare on the other, many people are not unlikely to give [Stoddard’s book] respectful consideration”.

In 1921, in a speech to a mixed-race audience in Birmingham, Alabama, U.S. President Warren Harding said that Black Americans must have full economic and political rights, but that segregation was also essential to prevent “racial amalgamation” and that social equality was thus a dream that Blacks must give up, and used the book to support his segregationist views: "Whoever will take the time to read and ponder Mr. Lothrop Stoddard’s book on The Rising Tide of Color . . . must realize that our race problem here in the United States is only a phase of a race issue that the whole world confronts."

The anthropologist Franz Boas criticised the scientific racism presented and advocated in The Rising Tide of Color, for which racialist advocacy the black newspapers of the U.S. called Stoddard "the high priest of racial baloney". In the 21st century, the racialism presented by Stoddard remains an ideological influence upon the philosophy and the politics of the white supremacist movement in the United States.

Synopsis 
The author claims that there is a perceived threat of non-white "races" to the global dominance of the white race. Stoddard argues that the increasing population and economic power of non-white races, particularly in Asia, will lead to a shift in global power away from white countries. He warns of the dangers of race mixing and the need for white countries to maintain their racial "purity" in order to preserve their alleged supremacy.  Stoddard argues that the white race has dominated world affairs for centuries and has created a civilization that is superior to all others.

In popular culture 
In the novel The Great Gatsby (1925), by F. Scott Fitzgerald, to provoke the narrator, Nick Carraway, the antagonist, Tom Buchanan, speaks approvingly of the racialism presented in a recent book: “Civilization’s going to pieces,” broke out Tom violently. “I’ve gotten to be a terrible pessimist about things. Have you read ‘The Rise of the Colored Empires’ by this man Goddard?”

See also 
Race of the future

References

External links 
The Rising Tide of Color Against White World-Supremacy (1922 ed.) via Google Books 
 The Rising Tide of Color at Project Gutenberg
 Library of Congress catalog entry

1920 non-fiction books
History of European colonialism
1920 in international relations
Conspiracist media
English-language books
White genocide conspiracy theory
white supremacy in the United States
Scientific racism